The French Quarter neighborhood of New Orleans, Louisiana is the center of the city's Carnival celebrations, especially on Mardi Gras Day.  This part of town is crowded with both tourists and locals, with the former more numerous in the Upper Quarter, the latter in the Lower Quarter.  There are numerous parties and more than one costume contest.  While the large motorized floats of the big parades have been prohibited since the early 1970s from going down the Quarter's narrow streets, numerous small marching krewes, parading jazz bands, and groups of revelers converge here.  Some krewes parade in the Quarter after starting earlier in the day in other parts of town.

Picture gallery

See also
 Faubourg Marigny Mardi Gras costumes
 New Orleans Mardi Gras

Mardi Gras in New Orleans
Costume design